Michael Lockwood may refer to:
Michael Lockwood (philosopher) (died 2018), British philosopher
Mike Lockwood (physicist) (born 1954), British physicist
Michael Lockwood (public servant) (born 1959), British public servant and local government officer
Michael Lockwood (guitarist) (born 1961), American guitarist and producer
Crash Holly (Michael Lockwood, 1971–2003), American professional wrestler